HMS Revenge was a 74-gun third-rate ship of the line of the Royal Navy, launched on 13 April 1805. Sir John Henslow designed her as one of the large class 74s; she was the only ship built to her draught. As a large 74, she carried 24-pounder guns on her upper gun deck, rather than the 18-pounder guns found on the middling and common class 74s.

Career

Newly commissioned, and captained by Robert Moorsom, she fought at the Battle of Trafalgar, where she sailed in Collingwood's column. Revenge was engaged at the Battle of Basque Roads in April 1809 under Captain Alexander Robert Kerr.

In October 1810, Revenge captured the French privateer cutter Vauteur off Cherbourg after a five-hour chase. Vauteur had been armed with 16 guns, but she threw 14 of them overboard during the chase. She had been out of Dieppe for 45 hours but had made no captures. She was the former British cutter John Bull, of Plymouth, and was restored to Plymouth on 19 October. The report in Lloyd's List announcing this news appears to have confused names. Vauteur appears to have been Vengeur. There is no account of Revenge capturing a Vauteur, but on 17 October, Revenge captured the French privateer lugger Vengeur, off Cherbourg. The lugger crossed to windward of Revenge before daylight, and Revenge gave chase, finally capturing her quarry after three hours. Vengeur was armed with 16 guns and had a crew of 78 men. She was one day out of Dieppe and had not taken any prizes.

On 6 November,  captured the privateer Surcouf. Revenge, Donegal, and the hired armed lugger  would share in the prize money for Vengeur and Surcouf.

On 13 November 1810, the frigates  and Niobe attacked two French frigates ( and Amazone), which sought protection under the shore batteries near Saint-Vaast-la-Hougue. Revenge and Donegal arrived two days later and together the four ships fired upon the French for as long as the tide would allow. The operation cost Donegal three men wounded. Élisa was driven ashore and ultimately destroyed as a result of this action; Amazone escaped safely into Le Havre.

She took part in the 1840 Syria operations as part of the Mediterranean fleet, under Capt. Waldegrave and was present in the attack on Acre.

Fate

Revenge served until 1842, being broken up in 1849. She was one of the first warships of the Royal Navy to be painted with the Nelson Checker.

Notes

References

 Lavery, Brian (2003) The Ship of the Line - Volume 1: The development of the battlefleet 1650-1850. Conway Maritime Press. .

External links
 
 Summary of Revenge's end. (Possibly fiction)

Ships of the line of the Royal Navy
Ships built in Chatham
1805 ships